USS Lenoir may refer to the following ships of the United States Navy:

, was launched 6 November 1944, decommissioned 13 June 1946 and sold in 1947
, was launched 15 July 1942 as PC-582, named Lenoir 1 February 1956 and struck from the Navy list 1 July 1960

United States Navy ship names